The Virgin and Child with Saint Anne is an unfinished oil painting by High Renaissance artist Leonardo da Vinci, dated to . It depicts Saint Anne, her daughter the Virgin Mary and the infant Jesus. Christ is shown grappling with a sacrificial lamb symbolizing his Passion as the Virgin tries to restrain him. The painting was commissioned as the high altarpiece for the Church of Santissima Annunziata in Florence and its theme had long preoccupied Leonardo.

History 
It is likely that the painting was commissioned by King Louis XII of France following the birth of his daughter in 1499, but it was never delivered to him. Leonardo probed into incorporating these figures together by drawing the Burlington House Cartoon (National Gallery). In 2008, a curator at the Louvre discovered several faint sketches believed to have been made by Leonardo on the back of the painting.  Infrared reflectography was used to reveal a "7-by-4 inch drawing of a horse's head", which had a resemblance to sketches of horses that Leonardo had made previously before drawing The Battle of Anghiari. Also revealed was a second sketch 6 inch-by-4  inch depiction of half a skull. A third sketch showed the infant Jesus playing with a lamb, which sketch was similar to that which is painted on the front side. The Louvre spokesperson said that the sketches were "very probably" made by Leonardo and that it was the first time that any drawing had been found on the "flip side of one of his works". The drawings will be further studied by a group of experts as the painting undergoes restoration.

Content and composition
Leonardo's painting is at once both pleasing, calm yet confusing upon closer examination. The composition of the three figures is fairly tight, with the Virgin Mary clearly interacting with the infant Jesus. Upon closer examination of their positioning it is apparent that Mary is sitting on Saint Anne's lap. It is unclear what meaning this could have and what meaning Leonardo intended to project with that pose. There is no clear parallel in other works of art and women sitting in each other's lap are not a clear cultural or traditional reference that the viewer can relate to. Additionally, although the exact sizes of neither the Mother Virgin nor Saint Anne are known, it can be extrapolated from the painting that Saint Anne is a significantly larger person than Mary. This subtle yet perceptible distortion in size was utilized by Leonardo to emphasize the mother–daughter relationship between the two women despite the apparent lack of visual cues to the greater age of Saint Anne that would otherwise identify her as the mother. The child is holding a lamb. We also see that Mary is gazing into her child's eyes, while Saint Anne is looking at Mary. As Mary is sitting on her lap and Saint Anne is looking at her, it is possible that Leonardo was trying to make a point about their relationship and personalities.

Freud's interpretation

Sigmund Freud undertook a psychoanalytic examination of Leonardo in his 1910 essay Leonardo da Vinci, A Memory of His Childhood. According to Freud, the Virgin's garment reveals a vulture when viewed sideways.  Freud claimed that this was a manifestation of a "passive homosexual" childhood fantasy that Leonardo wrote about in the Codex Atlanticus, in which he recounts being attacked as an infant in his crib by the tail of a vulture. Freud translated the passage thus:"It seems that I was always destined to be so deeply concerned with vultures – for I recall as one of my very earliest memories that while I was in my cradle a vulture came down to me, and opened my mouth with its tail, and struck me many times with its tail against my lips."

Unfortunately for Freud, the word 'vulture' was a mistranslation by the German translator of the Codex and the bird that Leonardo imagined was in fact a kite, a bird of prey which is also occasionally a scavenger. This disappointed Freud because, as he confessed to Lou Andreas-Salomé, he regarded Leonardo as "the only beautiful thing I have ever written". Some Freudian scholars have, however, made attempts to repair the theory by incorporating the kite.

Another theory proposed by Freud attempts to explain Leonardo's fondness of depicting the Virgin Mary with Saint Anne. Leonardo was raised by his blood mother initially before being "adopted" by the wife of his father Ser Piero. The idea of depicting the Mother of God with her own mother was therefore particularly close to Leonardo's heart, because he, in a sense, had "two mothers" himself. It is worth noting that in both versions of the composition (the Louvre painting and the London cartoon) it is hard to discern whether Saint Anne is a full generation older than Mary.

2011 cleaning controversy
On 7 October 2011 , a Paris art publication, reported that the restoration posed more danger to the painting than was previously expected. In late December 2011 and early January 2012 reports emerged that Ségolène Bergeon Langle, the former director of conservation for the Louvre and France's national museums, and Jean-Pierre Cuzin, the former director of paintings at the Louvre, both of the advisory committee supervising the painting's restoration, had resigned over a painting cleaning controversy, with critics claiming that the painting has been damaged by being cleaned so it became brighter than the artist ever intended.
Other experts spoke out in favour of the cleaning treatment.

See also 
 Virgin and Child with Saint Anne – type of iconography
 The Virgin and Child with Saint Anne and Saint John the Baptist

Notes

References

Sources

External links
 
 Freud, The Writer of Leonardo 

Paintings by Leonardo da Vinci
Paintings of the Madonna and Child by Leonardo da Vinci
1503 paintings
Paintings in the Louvre by Italian artists
Sheep in art
Altarpieces
Paintings of Saint Anne
Unfinished paintings
Nude art